Jinjiadu is a metro station on Line 2 and Line 4 of the Hangzhou Metro in China. It is located in the Yuhang District of Hangzhou. It was opened on 27 December 2017.

References

Railway stations in Zhejiang
Railway stations in China opened in 2017
Hangzhou Metro stations